George Rudd may refer to:

George Rudd (cricketer, born 1866) (1866–1921)
George Rudd (cricketer, born 1894) (1894–1957)
George Thomas Rudd (c. 1795–1847), English entomologist